Assa Singh v. Menteri Besar of Johore (1969) 2 MLJ 30 was a case heard in the Federal Court of Malaysia concerning the applicability of the Restricted Residence Enactment 1933 (RRE) after Malaysian independence in 1957. The Federal Court held that although the application of the RRE had resulted in the violation of Singh's rights under Articles 5 and 9  of the Constitution, these violations were Constitutional because Article 162  permitted the grandfathering of pre-independence laws.

Background

Assa Singh was arrested under the provisions of the RRE by the Police with a view to forcibly relocating him to another district to preserve security and public order. Singh filed a suit claiming that this was a violation of his rights under Articles 5 (personal liberty) and 9 (freedom of movement) of the Constitution. The trial judge then referred Singh's case to the Federal Court to determine the constitutionality of the RRE.

Decision

The case was heard in the Federal Court by Lord President of the Federal Court Mohamed Azmi Mohamed, Chief Justice Ong Hock Thye, Federal Justice Mohamed Suffian Mohamed Hashim, Federal Justice P. S. Gill, and Justice Raja Azlan Shah. The judges unanimously held that, although the RRE did violate Singh's rights, this did not void it as an unconstitutional law. Instead, they held that the RRE could still be applied by "reading these rights into the Enactment".

The Solicitor General had submitted that under the Constitution, only acts of law inconsistent with the Constitution that were passed after independence would be void, while Article 162 excepted legislation passed prior to independence. (Clause 6 of Article 162 permits a court to apply the pre-independence legislation by modifying it as required to conform with the Constitution.) This submission was accepted by Suffian, who wrote:

As a result, it was held that the RRE's breach of Singh's rights was constitutional, and Singh was not released.

Criticism

The decision in Assa Singh has been unfavourably compared with Surinder Singh Kanda v. The Government of the Federation of Malaya, a previous case dealing with the constitutionality of a law passed before independence. The final decision in Kanda was handed down by the Judicial Committee of the Privy Council, where Lord Denning held that if pre-independence legislation was inconsistent with the Constitution, the provisions of the Constitution would supersede those of the legislation in question.

One legal scholar has said:

See also

Loh Kooi Choon v. Government of Malaysia

Notes and references

Malaysian case law
1969 in case law
1969 in Malaysia
Malaysian constitutional law